Bayport-Blue Point High School is a high school in Bayport, New York, United States. It was originally constructed in 1927 as an elementary school and high school for the Hamlet of Bayport. It is part of Bayport-Blue Point Union-Free School District, along with three elementary schools (Academy Street, Blue Point, and Sylvan Avenue) and one middle school (James Wilson Young Middle School).

The school originally consisted of a single unit built in 1927, with numerous additions over the years, one in 1940 and another in 1960.

In March 2003, the Bayport-Blue Point School district passed a bond referendum that gave the high school significant upgrades. During the 2003-2004 school year, a new auditorium was built at the southwest corner of the school, and the music rooms were renovated. During the 2004-2005 school year, another addition was added at the northeast corner of the school incorporating a new front entrance, an enlarged cafeteria, and ten new classrooms. During the 2005-2006 school year, the gymnasium received significant upgrades, which included the addition of a newer but smaller auxiliary gymnasium, new weight rooms, and a secondary gymnasium lobby. The bond, which was completed in time for the 2006-2007 school year, cost $35.5 million, and added approximately 50,000 square feet in additional space.

In November 2015, the district passed another bond worth $30 million, of which $8 million is going into the high school. Among the improvements are the construction of two brand-new turf fields, restoration of the original 1927 building, locker replacement, and curb/masonry restoration.

Notable people
 Gabrielle Petito
 Brian Laundrie

Size
The high school has approximately 750 students and 100 staff members, making it amongst the smaller high schools on Long Island.

Notable features
Extracurricular activities include:

Academic:
 Tri-M Honor Society
 National Honor Society
 Student Council
 Science Olympiad
 SADD (Students Against Destructive Decisions)
 Interact
 DECA

Non-academic:
The school's cross country and track & field teams have won division, county, and state championship titles.  The baseball team won the State Championship in 2013 and 2014. The mascot is the Phantom, and the school colors are blue and gold. In Spring of 2017, the High School received a turf playing field.

References

External links
 School website
 Bayport-Blue Point High School

Public high schools in New York (state)
Islip (town), New York
Schools in Suffolk County, New York